Halet Hob (English: A State of Love) is the ninth studio album by Lebanese singer Elissa released by Rotana on 25 July 2014, making it her sixth album released by Rotana Records. On the first week of its release, the album managed to rank third on the Billboard World Albums chart. It remained on the chart for three consecutive weeks, ranking seventh and twelfth on the second and third week, respectively. The album also topped the iTunes Store's online sales in the Arab world.

The album included twelve songs with the Egyptian dialect and two songs with the Lebanese dialect.

Track listing

Notes
"Halet Hob" is an Arabic-language cover of the 2012 Turkish song "Senden Sonra" by Rafet El Roman.

Personnel
Adapted from the album liner notes.

 Hubert Ghorayeb - executive producer
 Yasser Anwar - mixing
 Tim Young - mastering
 Ahmad Ab El Salam - strings (track 1)
 Moustafa Aslan - guitar (tracks 1, 2, 4, 5, 6, 8, 10, 11, 12, 13)
 Badr El Mostafa - violin (track 1)
 Amer Gado - sound engineer (track 1)
 Majid Jridah - strings section leader (tracks 2, 3, 4, 14)
 Moustafa Bergamali - clarinet (tracks 2, 3)
 Nasser El Assaad - piano (track 3)
 Ousman Osert - percussion (track 4)
 Samer Kousaimy - flute (track 4)
 Mohamed Atif Imam - strings section leader (tracks 5, 11, 12, 13), violin (tracks 5, 11, 12, 13)
 Ahmad Gooda - recording engineer (tracks 5, 11, 12, 13)
 Mahmud Ezzat - recording engineer (tracks 5, 12, 13)
 Ahmad Ragab - bass guitar (tracks 5, 7, 12, 13)
 Maged Soroor - kanun (tracks 5, 6, 11, 12)
 Reda Bder - ney (tracks 5, 6, 11, 12, 13)
 Ahmad Ayadi - tabla (tracks 5, 6, 12, 13)
 Yahia El Mougi - violin (track 6)
 Said Kamal - strings (track 7), strings arrangement (track 8)
 Sherif Fahmi - guitar (track 7)
 Hamouso - clarinet (track 7)
 Carios - percussion (track 7)
 Mohamed Saad - accordion (track 8)
 Mohamed Fawzy - clarinet (track 8)
 Mohamed Esmael - sound engineer (track 8)
 Christina Makarkina - strings section leader (track 9)
 Edyta Majewska - cello (track 9)
 Melinda Popeski - cello (track 9)
 Pavo Filipovic - trombone (track 9)
 Tamer Ghneim - strings section leader (track 10)
 Islam Al Kasbajij - oud (track 10)
 Hisam El Arabi - rek (track 13)
 Shafic Toutayo - guitar (track 14)
 Ali Madbouh - ney (track 14)
 Jihad Asaad - kanun (track 14)
 Eli Rezkallah - creative director
 Bilal Houssami - assistant creative director
 Mohammed Olaymi - graphics
 Matthias Clamer - photography
 Mandy Merheb - fashion consultancy
 Yehia Shokr - hair
 Bassam Fattouh - make up

Charts

References

Elissa (singer) albums
Rotana Records albums
2014 albums